Nityanand Kanungo was one of India's prominent politicians from the state of Odisha, who held successive high-profile portfolios in Prime Minister Jawaharlal Nehru's cabinet.

Nityanand Kanungo was born in Cuttack on 4 May 1900 and was educated at Ravenshaw College and University College (Calcutta). He was a member of the Indian National Congress and served as a member of the Orissa Legislative Assembly from 1937 to 1939 and again from 1946 to 1952.

When Orissa was granted provincial autonomy as per the Government of India Act 1935, Kanungo served as the Minister for Revenue and Public Works Departments in the cabinet of Bishwanath Das from 1937 to 1939. He was again appointed a Minister in 1946 and served till 1952, looking after the Home, Law, Industries and Agriculture portfolios.

In 1952, Kanungo was elected to the Lok Sabha from the Kendrapara constituency. In September, 1954 he was appointed Union Deputy Minister of Commerce and Industry. From August 1955 in Prime Minister Jawaharlal Nehru's cabinet; he was Union Minister of Industries, and in June 1956 was designated Union Minister of Consumer Industries. In 1957, he was again returned to the Lok Sabha and was appointed Union Minister of Commerce. Kanungo was a member of the Indian Delegation to the International Labour Conference in San Francisco (1948) and was the Leader of the Delegation to the Conference of the International Rice Commission held in Jakarta in 1952.

In the 1962 Indian general election, Kanungo was elected to the Lok Sabha from the Cuttack constituency. He was Union Minister for Commerce and Industries, in the Nehru cabinet, and after the bifurcation of that portfolio, Union Minister, in turn, for Commerce and later for Industry. He finished up as Union Minister for Civil Aviation.

Kanungo served as the Governor of Gujarat from 1 August 1965 to 6 December 1967. He was the Governor of Bihar from 7 December 1967 to 20 January 1971.

See also
 List of Governors of Bihar

References

External links
 Official Biographical Sketch in Lok Sabha Website

1900 births
1988 deaths
People from Cuttack
Indian National Congress politicians
India MPs 1952–1957
India MPs 1957–1962
India MPs 1962–1967
Odisha politicians
Governors of Bihar
Governors of Gujarat
Odisha MLAs 1937–1945
Odisha MLAs 1946–1952
Lok Sabha members from Odisha
People from Kendrapara district
Commerce and Industry Ministers of India
Indian National Congress politicians from Odisha